"Blue Shadows" is a 1950 single by Lowell Fulson, featuring Lloyd Glenn at the "88".  The single was Lowell Fulson's biggest hit on the R&B chart, hitting number one for one week. The B-side, "Low Society Blues", peaked at number eight.

References

1950 singles
Lowell Fulson songs
B.B. King songs
Blues songs
1950 songs